Asplenium serratum, the bird's nest spleenwort, wild birdnest fern, or New World birdnest fern, is a fern of the New World/Americas.

Distribution
The fern is native to tropical Brazil, the Caribbean, and Florida of the Southeastern United States. It is rare in central and southern Florida, where it is a state-listed endangered species.

Description
Asplenium serratum is an epiphytic or lithophytic fern that grows on eroded limestone, tree trunks, rotting stumps, and fallen logs.

Taxonomy
Linnaeus was the first to describe American bird's-nest fern with the binomial Asplenium serratum in his Species Plantarum of 1753.

References

External links
Flora of North America: Asplenium serratum
USDA Plants Profile for Asplenium serratum (wild birdnest fern)
Miami.edu: Asplenium serratum photos

serratum
Ferns of the Americas
Ferns of Brazil
Ferns of the United States
Flora of the Caribbean
Flora of Florida
Epiphytes
Plants described in 1753
Taxa named by Carl Linnaeus
Least concern flora of the United States
Least concern biota of North America